Bakara is a populated place located in Nasarawa State, Nigeria.

References

External links
 Bakara. World Places.

Populated places in Nasarawa State